Mediator of RNA polymerase II transcription subunit 6 is one of the subunits of the Mediator complex. It is an enzyme that in humans is encoded by the MED6 gene.

Protein family 

This family of proteins represent the transcriptional mediator protein subunit 6 that is required for activation of many RNA polymerase II promoters and which are conserved from yeast to humans.

Interactions 

MED6 has been shown to interact with:
 Cyclin-dependent kinase 8,
 Estrogen receptor alpha, 
 MED21,  and
 Thyroid hormone receptor alpha.

References

Further reading

External links 
 
 

Protein families